Rafael França Bezerra (born 16 June 1983), commonly known as Rafael or Rafael Rato, is a Brazilian futsal player who plays for Valdepeñas and the Brazilian national team.

References

External links

LNFS profile
Inter Movistar profile

1983 births
Living people
Brazilian men's futsal players
FS Cartagena players
Inter FS players
Sportspeople from Recife